The Men's team kumite competition at the 2021 World Karate Championships was held from 18 to 21 November 2021.

Results

Finals

Repechage

Top half

Section 1

Section 2

Bottom half

Section 3

Section 4

References

External links
Draw

Men's team kumite